The Center for International Maritime Security (CIMSEC) is a 501(c)(3) non-partisan think tank incorporated as a non-profit in the state of Maryland.  CIMSEC was formed in 2012 and as of 2021 has 20 international chapters and over 3,000 members and subscribers in 60 countries.

The current President of CIMSEC is Christopher Stockdale-Garbutt and its Chairman of the Board of Directors is Guy Snodgrass.

History
CIMSEC was founded in 2012 by Scott Cheney-Peters, who also established the organization's first chapter in Washington, DC.

Publications and products
In 2015 CIMSEC published its first compendium, "Private Military Contractors", featuring curated content from CIMSEC members.

Since its founding, CIMSEC has featured articles on its NextWar blog dealing with myriad issues surrounding international maritime security. CIMSEC actively solicits articles from the maritime security community at large.

Analysis by CIMSEC members has been referenced in numerous publications, including Reuters, the Center for New American Security, Popular Mechanics, the United States Naval Institute and the Maritime Executive.

Chapters
CIMSEC has numerous chapters across the world, including North America, the UK, Europe, Africa, and Asia. Members are able to establish their own local chapters.

References

  8. In al Qaeda attack, lines between Pakistan military, militants blur
  9. How to Fight Submarines in the 21st Century
  10. Eritrea: Arabian Military Presence in Eritrea - Will It Worry Ethiopia?
  11. Le 5 armi degli Usa per vincere la cyber sfida con la Cina

Foreign policy and strategy think tanks in the United States
Think tanks established in 2012
2012 establishments in Washington, D.C.
Non-profit organizations based in Maryland
501(c)(3) organizations